Barbara Hardy may refer to:
 Barbara Hardy (literary scholar), British literary scholar, author, and poet
 Barbara Hardy (environmentalist), Australian environmentalist and scientist